The 2004 OFC Nations Cup was the  edition of the tournament for the OFC Nations Cup and doubled as the qualification tournament to the 2006 FIFA World Cup, except the two-legged final. A separate playoff between Australia and Solomon Islands was held in September 2005, for World Cup Qualifying purposes.

The competition was divided in two Group stages (the first is the Qualifying Stage), with Australia and New Zealand seeded into the second stage (Final Stage). The Oceania champion (Australia) qualified for the 2005 FIFA Confederations Cup.

Qualification

The 10 teams in the first round were divided into two sections of five teams each. Each team played every other team once. The top two teams from each group then progressed to the second group stage, where they were joined by the two seeded teams.

Venues

Squads
See 2004 OFC Nations Cup squads

Final tournament
The four surviving members (first and second place teams from each group in stage one) of the first stage joined the two seeded teams (Australia and New Zealand) and took part in a tournament where each team played every other once in a tournament held in Adelaide, Australia.

As this doubled as the 2004 Oceania Nations Cup, the top two teams from the second group stage progressed to a two-legged final to determine the winner of the OFC Nations Cup. These two games on home-and-away basis was separate from World Cup qualifying.

The top two teams from this stage also progressed to the final stage of the 2006 Oceania World Cup qualifying tournament.

Australia and the Solomon Islands progressed to the final stage.

Final

The final of the 2004 Oceania Nations Cup was a two-legged home and away final between the top two teams from the second group stage.

Australia won 11–1 on aggregate and became the 2004 Oceania Nations Cup Champions. They also qualified for the 2005 Confederations Cup.

Although the second round of 2004 OFC Nations Cup doubled the second round of 2006 FIFA World Cup Oceanian qualification, the final play-off for the World Cup was held separately. Australia defeated Solomon Islands again, winning 9–1 on aggregate, and advanced to a play-off against the CONMEBOL (South American) nation Uruguay.

Goalscorers (final stage)
There were 69 goals scored in 17 matches, for an average of 4.06 goals per match.

6 goals
  Tim Cahill
  Vaughan Coveny

4 goals
  Brett Emerton
  Brent Fisher
  Commins Menapi

3 goals
  Ahmad Elrich
  Josip Skoko
  Mile Sterjovski
  Batram Suri

2 goals
  John Aloisi
  Ante Milicic
  Adrian Madaschi
  Veresa Toma
  Ryan Nelsen
  Duncan Oughton

1 goal
  Marco Bresciano
  Scott Chipperfield
  Harry Kewell
  Archie Thompson
  Tony Vidmar
  David Zdrilic
  Laisiasa Gataurua
  Che Bunce
  Neil Jones
  Aaron Lines
  Henry Fa'arodo
  Mahlon Houkarawa
  Paul Kakai
  Gabriel Wajoka
  Axel Temataua
  Lexa Bibi
  Richard Iwai
  Jean Maleb
  Seimata Chilia
  Alphose Qorig

Own goals
  Vincent Simon (for Australia)

Goalscorers (both stages)

7 goals
  Veresa Toma

6 goals
  Tim Cahill
  Michel Hmae
  Vaughan Coveny
  Reginald Davani

4 goals
  Brett Emerton
  Laisiasa Gataurua
  Seveci Rokotakala
  Brent Fisher
  Andrew Lepani
  Batram Suri
  Henry Fa'arodo
  Commins Menapi
  Jean Maleb
  Etienne Mermer

3 goals
  Ahmad Elrich
  Josip Skoko
  Mile Sterjovski
  Waisake Sabutu
  Paul Poatinda
  Pierre Wajoka
  Alick Maemae
  Axel Temataua
  Seimata Chilia
  Alphose Qorig

2 goals
  John Aloisi
  Ante Milicic
  Esala Masinisau
  José Hmae
  Ryan Nelsen
  Duncan Oughton
  Paul Komboi
  Mauri Wasi
  Tama Fasavalu
  Junior Michael
  Gideon Omorokio
  Jack Samani
  Gabriel Wajoka
  Wilkins Lauru

1 goal
  Natia Natia
  Marco Bresciano
  Scott Chipperfield
  Harry Kewell
  Adrian Madaschi
  Archie Thompson
  Tony Vidmar
  David Zdrilic
  John Pareanga
  Pita Rabo
  Thomas Vulivuli
  Ramon Djamali
  Robert Kaume
  Che Bunce
  Neil Jones
  Aaron Lines
  Eric Komeng
  Michael Lohai
  Nathaniel Lepani
  Dennis Bryce
  George Suri
  Mahlon Houkarawa
  Paul Kakai
  Leslie Leo
  Stanley Waita
  Rino Moretta
  Vincent Simon
  Mark Uhatahi
  Viliami Vaitaki
  Lexa Bibi
  Richard Iwai
  Moise Poida
  Lorry Thomsen

Own goals
  Vincent Simon (for Australia)

External links
 RSSSF Accessed 21 February 2010.

 
Nations
OFC Nations Cup tournaments
International association football competitions hosted by Australia
Ofc Nations Cup, 2004
2
2004–05 in New Zealand association football